Germany first competed at the 1934 World Championships.  They did not compete at another World Championships until 1954, in which East Germany and West Germany competed as a joint team.  Starting at the 1958 World Championships the two national competed as separate teams.  In 1991 Germany competed for the first time as a reunified team.

Medalists

Medal tables

By gender

By event

See also 
 Germany men's national artistic gymnastics team
 Germany women's national artistic gymnastics team
 List of Olympic male artistic gymnasts for Germany
 List of Olympic female artistic gymnasts for Germany

References 

World Artistic Gymnastics Championships
Gymnastics in Germany